Jeddore Oyster Ponds is a community on the Eastern Shore  of the Halifax Regional Municipality Nova Scotia  on Marine Drive on Trunk 7 49.2 Kilometers from Halifax. It lies on the northeast side of Jeddore Harbour.

Museums
The Fisherman’s Life Museum

Schools 
Oyster Pond Academy

Demographics
Total Population   195
Total Dwellings    304
Total Land Area    113.129 7 km2

Communications
Telephone exchange 902 - 845 - 889
Postal code - B0J 1W0

Navigator

References

Explore HRM

Communities in Halifax, Nova Scotia
General Service Areas in Nova Scotia